Den döende dandyn may refer to:

Den döende dandyn (The Dying Dandy), a 1918 painting by Nils Dardel
Den döende dandyn (album), a 1986 album by Magnus Uggla